Kikwit Airport  is an airport serving the Kwilu River port of Kikwit, the capital city of the Kwilu District in the Democratic Republic of the Congo. The airport is within the city limits.

Airlines and destinations

See also

Transport in the Democratic Republic of the Congo
List of airports in the Democratic Republic of the Congo

References

External links
OpenStreetMap - Kikwit
OurAirports - Kikwit
Google Maps - Kikwit
FallingRain - Kikwit Airport

Airports in Kwilu Province
Kikwit